Uluköy (formerly: Sonusa) is a village in the Taşova District, Amasya Province, Turkey. Its population is 1,047 (2021). Before the 2013 reorganisation, it was a town (belde). Scholars believe this was Roman Annisa or Annesi, the site of Basil of Caesarea's family land and monastic center.

References

Villages in Taşova District